There Goes Susie is a 1934 British comedy film directed by Victor Hanbury and John Stafford and starring Gene Gerrard, Wendy Barrie, and Zelma O'Neal. Based on a story by Charlie Roellinghoff and Hans Jacoby, it was made by British International Pictures at Elstree Studios. It is a remake of the 1933 German film Marion, That's Not Nice. A separate Italian version Model Wanted was also made.

In 1935 the film was given an American release under the title Scandals of Paris.

Cast
 Gene Gerrard as Andre Cochet 
 Wendy Barrie as Madeleine Sarteaux 
 Zelma O'Neal as Bunny 
 Gus McNaughton as Brammel 
 Henry Wenman as Otto Sarteaux 
 Gibb McLaughlin as Advertising Manager 
 Bobbie Comber as Uncle Oscar 
 Mark Daly as Sunshine

Plot
An artist is hired by a major soap company for an advertisement. He paints a model in a revealing pose, only to discover she is the boss' daughter.

References

Bibliography
 Low, Rachael. Filmmaking in 1930s Britain. George Allen & Unwin, 1985.
 Wood, Linda. British Films, 1927-1939. British Film Institute, 1986.

External links

1934 comedy films
1934 films
British comedy films
Films directed by Victor Hanbury
Films shot at British International Pictures Studios
British remakes of German films
Films about fictional painters
Films about advertising
British black-and-white films
1930s English-language films
1930s British films